Hovamyia is a genus of crane fly in the family Limoniidae.

Distribution
Madagascar, Comoros, Cameroon, Mozambique, Nigeria, Sierra Leone, Uganda & Zimbabwe.

Species
H. apicistyla Alexander, 1961
H. armillata (Enderlein, 1912)
H. immaculipes Alexander, 1955
H. jacentia Alexander, 1951
H. monilifera (Alexander, 1920)
H. polyperiscelis Alexander, 1960
H. subarmillata Alexander, 1979
H. suffuscipes Alexander, 1951
H. venustipes (Alexander, 1920)

References

Limoniidae
Nematocera genera
Diptera of Africa